Gianni Seraf (born 5 July 1994) is a French professional footballer who plays as a midfielder for Championnat National 2 club Thonon Evian.

Career

Before the second half of the 2015–16 season, Seraf signed for Vilanova in the Spanish fifth division, after having playing for the reserves of French Ligue 1 side Montpellier. Before the second half of the 2016–17 season, he signed for JS Saoura in Algeria.

In 2018, Seraf signed for Greek top flight club Panionios.

In 2019, Seraf signed for Northern Irish team Derry City, before joining Sainte-Geneviève in the French fourth division.

Personal life 
Born in France, Seraf is of Algerian descent.

Honours 
Thonon Evian

 Championnat National 3: 2021–22

References

External links
 

1994 births
Living people
People from Thiais
French footballers
French sportspeople of Algerian descent
Association football midfielders
Montpellier HSC players
JS Saoura players
Tarbes Pyrénées Football players
Panionios F.C. players
Derry City F.C. players
Sainte-Geneviève Sports players
Paris 13 Atletico players
Thonon Evian Grand Genève F.C. players
Championnat National 3 players
Championnat National 2 players
Algerian Ligue Professionnelle 1 players
Super League Greece players
League of Ireland players
French expatriate footballers
Expatriate footballers in Spain
Expatriate footballers in Algeria
Expatriate footballers in Greece
Expatriate association footballers in the Republic of Ireland
French expatriate sportspeople in Spain
French expatriate sportspeople in Algeria
French expatriate sportspeople in Greece
French expatriate sportspeople in Ireland
Footballers from Val-de-Marne